Soumyajit Ghosh (born 10 May 1993) is an Indian table tennis player from Siliguri, West Bengal. He was the youngest Indian player to qualify for the London, 2012 Olympics. He also became the youngest national champion at the age of 19, when he defeated Sharath Kamal in the 74th National Table Tennis Championships. He was placed under provisional suspension and dropped from the Indian Team and replaced by Sanil Shetty for the 2018 Commonwealth Games after a complaint of rape was filed against him by an 18-year-old teenager in Barasat, West Bengal. He has denied the allegations. He later married the girl who accused him of rape.

Personal 
Ghosh hails from a middle-class family in Siliguri, West Bengal. His father Hari Sankar Ghosh works for the local municipal corporation. His mother Mina Ghosh is a homemaker. Soumyajit is his parents' only child. In India he trains at the NIS base in Patiala under coach Bhawani Mukherjee. When abroad he trains under coach Peter Karlsson in Falkenberg, Sweden.  Ghosh is the Indian number 1 in table tennis as per the world ranking (nov 2016). recently he is world no 63 As of November 2016

Career

Early career

In 2010, Ghosh won mixed doubles bronze medal at the World Junior Championships in Bahrain. He was instrumental in helping the India national team clinch a bronze medal in the World Junior Championships in 2011, by winning both his singles matches against South Korea in the quarter-finals. He was also an integral part of the team that won the Asian Junior Championships in 2011.

2013

In 2013, Ghosh created history by becoming the youngest national champion ever by beating six-time champion Sharath Kamal in the finals of the 74th National Table Tennis Championships. He followed that up by winning the singles event at the Inter Institutional Table Tennis Championships in Dharwad, Karnataka. He also won the singles event in the U-21 category at the Brazil Open in Santos.

2014

At the Lusofonia Games, 2014 in Goa, Ghosh won gold medal in mixed doubles and men's team event as well as a silver and bronze in men's singles and doubles respectively. He was also a quarter finalist at the Senior National Ranking Table Tennis Championships in Patna, 2014. At the 2014 Commonwealth Games, Glasgow Ghosh reached the quarter finals of both men's singles and doubles. He also reached the semis of the team event.

2015
At the WTTC 2015, Soumyajit reached R64 by beating Quadri Aruna.

2016 
On 14 April 2016, Soumyajit Ghosh qualified for the 2016 Rio Olympics. However, he made a first round exit in the men's individual event losing to Padasak Tanviriyavechakul of Thailand.

2017 
On 30 April 2017, Soumyajit Ghosh won the ITTF Challenge Seamaster Chile Open singles event, by beating compatriot Anthony Amalraj in the final. This was his first ITTF Pro title and he became the third Indian to win an ITTF event.

References

Indian male table tennis players
Living people
Table tennis players at the 2012 Summer Olympics
Table tennis players at the 2016 Summer Olympics
Olympic table tennis players of India
1993 births
Table tennis players at the 2014 Asian Games
Racket sportspeople from West Bengal
People from Siliguri
Asian Games competitors for India
Recipients of the Arjuna Award
Table tennis players at the 2014 Commonwealth Games
Commonwealth Games competitors for India
South Asian Games gold medalists for India
South Asian Games medalists in table tennis
20th-century Indian people
21st-century Indian people